Nataliya Shlemova (born 21 May 1978) is a Tajikistani diver. She competed in the women's 3 metre springboard event at the 1996 Summer Olympics.

References

External links

1978 births
Living people
Tajikistani female divers
Olympic divers of Tajikistan
Divers at the 1996 Summer Olympics
Place of birth missing (living people)